FC YPA is a Finnish football club from the town of Ylivieska. FC YPA was formed in 1998. The club is currently playing in the Kakkonen, the third tier of the Finnish league system. FC YPA play their home matches at Safari.

They also have a futsal team, Sievi Futsal.

Season to season

References and sources
Official Website

Football clubs in Finland
1998 establishments in Finland